Einar Fagstad (30 October 1899 in Lillehammer – 19 February 1961 in Göteborg) was a Norwegian–Swedish accordionist, singer, actor and composer.

Fagstad began playing accordion aged four. He trained as a painter and studied at the Norwegian National Academy of Craft and Art Industry (1916–1917). He was employed as an accompanist from 1923  by Ernst Rolf who produced a series of musical revues. Fagstad made his film debut in 1929  under the direction of Gustaf Edgren (1895–1954) in  Swedish movie   Konstgjorda Svensson .

Fagstad was married to actress  Gertie Löwenström (1898–1982).

Film music
 Skipper's Love (1931)

Selected filmography
 40 Skipper Street (1925)
 Ship Ahoy! (1931)
 A Night of Love by the Öresund (1931)
 Servant's Entrance (1932)
 Love and Dynamite (1933)
 Vi som går kjøkkenveien (1933)
 Andersson's Kalle (1934)
 Ryska snuvan (1937)
 Valfångare (1939)
 The Jazz Boy (1958)
 The Koster Waltz (1958)

References

Norwegian accordionists
20th-century Norwegian male singers
20th-century Norwegian singers
Norwegian male composers
Norwegian male film actors
Norwegian male silent film actors
20th-century Norwegian male actors
Swedish accordionists
Swedish male singers
Swedish male film actors
Swedish male silent film actors
20th-century Swedish male actors
Swedish male composers
Musicians from Lillehammer
1899 births
1961 deaths
20th-century composers
20th-century accordionists